This is a list of terror attacks in Damascus within modern Syria (after independence in 1946).

1949
On Friday night, August 5, 1949, several hand grenades were thrown into the Menarsha Synagogue in Damascus. 12 Jews, eight of them children, were killed and about 30 others injured. The attack was timed to coincide with the Lausanne Conference, following the armistice agreement which was signed between Israel and Syria on July 20, 1949.

1986
The deadliest bombings were executed in Damascus and surrounding areas in 1986. The events caused 144 fatalities, and were blamed by the Syrian authorities upon Iraqi Ba'athist agents, though other alleged perpetrators, like the Muslim Brotherhood, were proposed.

2004
April 28: Three gunmen, a policeman, and one civilian were killed in an attack on the diplomatic quarter of Damascus, damaging a building formerly used by the UN. Police blamed Islamists.

2006
June 2: Four gunmen and two security guards were killed when Syrian security forces foiled an attack by Islamist militants near the studios of Syrian National Television.
September 12: Three gunmen and a Syrian security guard were killed in a foiled attack on the U.S. embassy. Gunmen tossed grenades over the perimeter walls before opening fire with automatic weapons. A car bomb was detonated outside the embassy, although a truck bomb filled with pipe bombs and gas cylinders failed to explode. Thirteen people were wounded, including two security guards and a Chinese diplomat. Police also captured one gunman, although he later died of his wounds. The Syrian government said the attack was planned in Saudi Arabia and the attackers had no links to al-Qaeda.

2008
12 February: Assassination of Imad Mughniyeh.
27 September: Bombing in Damascus kills 17; Fatah al-Islam blamed.

2009
December 3: A little more than year later another explosion killed at least three people when a bus blew up in Sayyidah Zaynab, a Damascus suburb popular with Iranian and other Shiite pilgrims and named after a shrine dedicated to the granddaughter of the Prophet Muhammad located there. Syrian officials denied Terrorism was involved, blaming the deaths on an exploding tire and banned reporters from the site.

2011
2011 Damascus bombings - event in December 2011, during Syrian civil war.

2012
January 2012 al-Midan bombing- during Syrian civil war.
March 2012 Damascus bombings- during Syrian civil war.
April 2012 Damascus bombings- during Syrian civil war.
10 May 2012 Damascus bombings- during Syrian civil war.
18 July 2012 Damascus bombing - during Battle of Damascus of the Syrian civil war.

2013
February 2013 Damascus bombings - attacks in Damascus during Syrian civil war, killing 83 people.

2016
5 September 2016 Syria bombings

2017
March 2017 Damascus bombings -  A series of terrorist attacks in Damascus killed at least 114 people. Tahrir al-Sham, formerly known as the al-Nusra Front, and Islamic State claimed responsibility.

See also
List of terrorist incidents in Syria

References

External links
ABC Exclusive: Video Shows U.S. Embassy Terror Attack

 
Damascus
Damascus
Terrorist attacks in Damascus